KGGF may refer to:

 KGGF (AM), a radio station (690 AM) licensed to Coffeyville, Kansas, United States
 KGGF-FM, a radio station (104.1 FM) licensed to Fredonia, Kansas, United States